Anastathes robusta is a species of beetle in the family Cerambycidae. It was described by Judson Linsley Gressitt in 1940. It is known from China.

References

Astathini
Beetles described in 1940